The 1996 Svenska Cupen final took place on 23 May 1996 at Gamla Ullevi in Gothenburg. The match was contested by Allsvenskan sides AIK and Malmö FF. AIK played their first final since 1985 and their 10th final in total, Malmö FF played their first final since 1989 and their 17th final in total. A golden goal in extra time secured AIKs fifth cup title.

Road to the Final

Match details

External links
Svenska Cupen at svenskfotboll.se

1996
Cupen
Malmö FF matches
AIK Fotboll matches
Football in Gothenburg
May 1996 sports events in Europe
Sports competitions in Gothenburg
1990s in Gothenburg